Anna's Sin is a 1953 Italian melodrama film is a retelling of Shakespeare's Othello.

Cast
Anna Vita as  Anna 
Ben Johnson as John  
William Demby as Sam 
 Paul Muller as Alberto

External links
 

1953 films
1950s Italian-language films
Films directed by Camillo Mastrocinque
Films about actors
Italian drama films
1953 drama films
Italian black-and-white films
1950s Italian films